Dividing Creek is a  tributary of the Pocomoke River on the Delmarva Peninsula. It rises in Wicomico County, Maryland, and forms the boundary between Somerset and Worcester counties.

The entire watershed is in the Atlantic coastal plain and quickly reaches sea level at the Pocomoke.  The original county courthouse for pre-1742 Somerset County was located not far above the mouth of Dividing Creek, close to its west bank.

References

Tributaries of the Chesapeake Bay
Rivers of Maryland
Rivers of Somerset County, Maryland
Rivers of Wicomico County, Maryland
Rivers of Worcester County, Maryland